Troschel's treefrog (Boana calcarata), also known as the blue-flanked treefrog or the convict treefrog, is a species of frog in the family Hylidae. It is found in most parts of the Amazon Basin, except in the southeast and the Guianas. Colombian, Venezuelan, and Surinamese records need confirmation.

Taxonomy
This species was originally described by Franz Hermann Troschel as Hyla calcarata in 1848. After Edward Drinker Cope transferred it to the genus Hypsiboas as Hypsiboas calcaratus in 1867, it was variously recognized with either name until Faivovich and colleagues validated Hypsiboas in 2005. However, in 2017  showed that Hypsiboas was a junior synonym of Boana, the latter then being the valid name. Many sources, however, still use the old name.

Description
Adult males measure  and adult females  in snout–vent length. The fingers have only basal webbing while the toes are webbed. Males have pre-pollical spines. The dorsal coloration varies from light brown to reddish brown or brown. There is a dark brown middorsal line, and some specimens have brown diffuse transversal bands. The limbs bear pale brown transversal bars dorsally. Scattered minute white and black dots, or large dark brown blotches, might be present on the dorsum. The flanks are white, light blue or blue and have dark brown vertical bars. The venter is creamy white and the belly is yellowish white.

Habitat and conservation
It is an arboreal frog. During the rainy season, adults can be seen perched on stems and small branches above slow-moving streams. The eggs are deposited in water where the larvae will then develop. Habitat loss associated with forest conversion, logging, clear cutting, and fire is a threat to this species. However, it is abundant in parts of its range, is present in protected areas, and is not threatened overall.

References

Boana
Amphibians of Bolivia
Amphibians of Brazil
Amphibians of Colombia
Amphibians of Ecuador
Amphibians of French Guiana
Amphibians of Guyana
Amphibians of Peru
Amphibians of Suriname
Amphibians of Venezuela
Taxa named by Franz Hermann Troschel
Amphibians described in 1848
Taxonomy articles created by Polbot